Kabaağaç can refer to:

 Kabaağaç, Havsa
 Kabaağaç, Sarayköy